Sarmandeyevka is a rural locality (a village) in Kosh-Yelginsky Selsoviet, Bizhbulyaksky District, Bashkortostan, Russia. The population was 2 as of 2010. There is 1 street.

Geography 
Sarmandeyevka is located 53 km north of Bizhbulyak (the district's administrative centre) by road. Stepanovka and Vishnevka are the nearest rural localities.

References 

Rural localities in Bizhbulyaksky District